Sandra “Sandy” Carter is an American businesswoman, speaker and author. She was a general manager at IBM from 2013 to 2016, vice president at Amazon Web Services from 2017 to 2021 and is currently  senior VP of business development at Unstoppable Domains.

Biography
Carter holds a Bachelor of Science in computer science from Duke University and an MBA from Harvard Business School. She is fluent in eight programming languages. She is the author of five books, including “The New Language of Business: SOA & Web 2.0”, which won the Platinum MarCom Award in 2008, and “The New Language of Marketing 2.0: Social Media”, which won the Silver MarketingSherpa award in 2009.

She is chairman of the board for the non-profit organization Girls in Tech as well as for the non-governmental organisation WITI (Women in Technology International) and an adjunct professor at Carnegie Mellon Silicon Valley. Carter is also a founder and CEO at Silicon-Blitz and has helped many start-ups and companies with technology, cognitive diversity and innovation.

Sandra is currently a member of the advisory board of the Internet of Things Community.

360Fashion Network created a hot pink wireless charging wallet designed by Anina Net, and named "The Sandy" after Carter, one of the world's leading women in technology, which is on display in the Museum of Science and Industry Chicago's "Wired to Wear" exhibition and for sale in the MSI Museum Shop.

Recognition
"Top 3 Innovation Influencer" from SXSW (2017)
"Brand Leader of the Year" from the "World Brand Congress" (2009)
Fast Company "Most Influential 'Women' in Technology" (2009)
CNN Magazine "Ten most powerful women in tech"(2012)
NAFE "Social Media Star" and "Woman of Excellence" (2012)
Franz Edelman Laureate for Analytics Innovation

Selected publications

Carter has authored four books “The New Language of Business: SOA & Web 2.0”, which won the Platinum MarCom Award in 2008, and “The New Language of Marketing 2.0: Social Media”, which won the Silver Marketing Sherpa award in 2009, "Get Bold” in 2011, and "Extreme Innovation: 3 Superpowers for Purpose and Profit" released in 2017.

"The New Language of Business: SOA & Web 2.0.", IBM Press, 2007, 
"The New Language of Marketing 2.0: How to Use ANGELS to Energize Your Market", IBM Press, 2008, 
"Get Bold: Using Social Media to Create a New Type of Social Business”, IBM Press, 2011 
 "Extreme Innovation: 3 Superpowers for Purpose and Profit", Param Media, 2017 , 
"Geek Girls are Chic", e-book, 2015

References

External links
 http://socialbusinesssandy.com/
 http://www.booksbysandy.com
http://sandycarter.net/about/

Year of birth missing (living people)
Living people
IBM employees
Duke University alumni
Harvard Business School alumni
American women business executives
21st-century American women